The 2021 Columbus Crew season was the club's twenty-sixth season of existence and their twenty-sixth consecutive season in Major League Soccer, the top flight of American soccer. The season covers the period from December 13, 2020 to November 7, 2021. It is the third season under head coach Caleb Porter.

The 2021 season sees Columbus defending their 2020 MLS Cup championship, as well as the opening of Lower.com Field, the club's new downtown stadium. They hosted the 2021 Campeones Cup against Cruz Azul, the winner of the Liga MX's Campeón de Campeones winning 2-0. The club also participated in the CONCACAF Champions League, their first appearance since the 2010–11 tournament.

The team began playing the season under the name Columbus Crew SC until a rebrand on May 10, 2021, after which the name was changed to Columbus SC. However, after criticism over the rebrand was spurred by its fans, the club announced that it would return to its original name. The "SC" was dropped and the club was once again the Columbus Crew.

This was the last season in which Columbus Crew played at Historic Crew Stadium, where the team played their final match against the Chicago Fire on June 19, 2021 with a 2–0 win. The team then moved to Lower.com Field near downtown Columbus, where they would play their first match at the new stadium against the New England Revolution with a 2–2 draw on July 3, 2021.

Roster

 (HG) = Homegrown Player
 (DP) = Designated Player
 (INT) = Player using International Roster Slot

Non-competitive

Preseason

Competitive

MLS

Standings

Eastern Conference

Overall table

Results summary

Results by round

Match results
On March 10, 2021 the league announced the home openers for every club, with Columbus playing Philadelphia Union at Historic Crew Stadium.

U.S. Open Cup

On July 20, US Soccer finally announced that the tournament would be cancelled for 2021 and would resume in 2022.

Qualifying 
On March 29, 2021, US Soccer announced that qualification for MLS clubs would be determined by the highest number of regular season points per game at the conclusion of the first three weeks of MLS play (April 16 – May 4).

CONCACAF Champions League

Round of 16

Quarter-finals

Campeones Cup

Statistics

Appearances and goals
Under "Apps" for each section, the first number represents the number of starts, and the second number represents appearances as a substitute.

|}

Disciplinary record

Clean sheets

Transfers

In

Loan in

SuperDraft

The following players were selected by Columbus in the MLS SuperDraft.

Out

Loans out

Kits

See also
 Columbus Crew
 2021 in American soccer
 2021 Major League Soccer season

Notes

References

Columbus Crew seasons
Columbus Crew
Columbus Crew
Columbus Crew
Columbus